The Worshipful Company of Upholders is one of the Livery Companies of the City of London. "Upholder" is an archaic word for "upholsterer". In past times upholders carried out not just the manufacture and sale of upholstered goods but were cabinet makers, undertakers, soft furnishers, auctioneers and valuers. The organisation was formed on 1 March 1360 and officially incorporated by a Royal Charter granted by Charles I in 1626. The Company originally had the right to set standards for upholstery within London, and to search, seize and destroy defective upholstery. However, over the years, the Company's power has eroded, as has the profession of upholsterers, because of the advancement of technology.

The Livery's purpose today is:
To Uphold the livery of the Upholders, ensuring it continues to flourish. Upholding the craft of the Upholder and through charitable giving uphold individuals and organisations connected with our trade and Livery.

In support of the upholstery and soft furnishing trade the Livery provides prizes and bursaries to students studying these crafts. It gives Merit Awards to companies achieving the highest standards of craftsmanship and Master Craftsman awards to individuals. Working closely with the Association of Master Upholsterers and Soft Furnishers it is developing a "Centres of Excellence" scheme for colleges and other organisations to ensure the skills of traditional upholstery are taught and passed on to professionals and enthusiasts. In 2017 the first Upholders' apprentice to complete his training through Livery Companies' Apprenticeship Scheme was awarded his certificate by the Lord Mayor of London. As well as working with the AMUSF the Company supports the Guild of Traditional Upholsterers. The Livery provides a small number of pensions to pensioners in special need who have worked in the trade.

Upholders arranged the funeral of Admiral Lord Nelson and the Livery is proud to include undertakers today. Members of the company continue to be involved with the funerals of national figures. The name undertaker also has Upholder as part of its root.

The Livery through its charities the Peter Jackson Charity and the Neville Hayman Charity supports its crafts & craftsmen, other charities connected with the City of London and the armed forces. The Livery has particularly close connections with TS Upholder, the Chelmsford Sea Cadet unit.

The Livery and Liverymen are actively involved in many organisations and charities in the City of London including Castle Baynard Ward Club, as the site of the Company's Hall until the Great Fire in 1666 is in the Ward. The Company is the forty-ninth in the order of precedence for Livery Companies. Its motto is Sustine Bona, Latin for Uphold the Good.

References

Further reading
John Houston, Feather Bedds and Flock Bedds

External links
 

Upholders
1360 establishments in England